Riccardo Billi (22 April 1906 – 15 April 1982) was an Italian film actor and comedian. With Mario Riva he appeared as Billi & Riva, one of the most popular Italian comic duos in the 1950s.

He appeared in around 85 films between 1938 and his death in 1982.

Filmography

External links

Riccardo Billiat Fandango 
Riccardo Billiat Blockbuster 

1906 births
1982 deaths
Italian male film actors
20th-century Italian male actors